Anthony George Skordi is a British-American actor. He is best known for his roles as Admiral Garrick Versio in Star Wars Battlefront II, and The Dealer in the Hand of Fate series of games. In addition to his voiceover work in video games, he has narrated audiobooks, and has worked on screen and stage as an actor, producer, and writer.

Biography 
Skordi was born in London to Greek Cypriot parents with Greek/Sicilian and Eastern European heritage. He attended Drama Centre London, and later toured with the Royal Shakespeare Company from 1990-1992 and played the lead role in the gripping Play by Irish writer, Joe Hinch. The Holding cell. RSC.Vanessa Redgrave's Moving Theatre.

He is a United States citizen, and currently resides in Los Angeles, California.

Career 
Some of his early roles include British television series including episodes of Soldier Soldier, The Bill and Thief Takers.

Skordi wrote, produced and starred in the one-man show Onassis, The Play at the Stella Adler theater to favorable reviews, being praised as a "Master of Storytelling". It was originally planned to bring the play to New York City in 2020, but the theatre production had to be delayed due to the restrictions put into place during the COVID-19 pandemic in the United States. He performed off Broadway to critical acclaim Feb-March 2022 at The American Theatre of Actors. Though he had been providing narration for commercials and audio books, he was introduced to a new audience through voice acting in video games, his first role being God of War III, alongside other notable actors Kevin Sorbo, Gideon Emery, and Rip Torn. He went on to provide voices for The Elder Scrolls V: Skyrim, the Mass Effect series, Diablo III, and starred as Valenos, the Dealer, in the Hand of Fate series by Defiant Development. In 2017, he had a prominent role in Star Wars Battlefront II, both as a voice actor and motion capture actor, as Admiral Garrick Versio. He had also previously provided motion capture for Sleeping Dogs. Since 2015, Skordi has also been narrating the audio for the drama series John Sinclair – Demon Hunter.

His work in television continued in the United States, where he featured in episodes of Scorpion, The Blacklist, The Last Ship, and others. British TV appearance as series regular as Silas Manatos in Prime Suspect 1973. In 2019, he appeared as the Caliph of Oran in the miniseries Catch-22.

Skordi is also a prolific film actor. A short film portraying the Armenian genocide, Straw Dolls features Anthony Skordi in the lead role as Ahmet, a conflicted Turkish soldier. He acted alongside Kevin Spacey in the short film Envelope. Skordi portrayed Father Nicolas in Don Quixote, which was featured at the Palm Springs Film Festival in 2015. He also appeared as August in Stage Mother, playing opposite Jacki Weaver.

Anthony recently portrayed Silas Manatos in Prime Suspect 1973 and Carlo Gambino in The Offer

In addition to his work in the US, he has worked in the UK, Greece, Cyprus, Italy, Spain and Brazil.

Filmography

Film

Television

Video games

References

External link
 

Living people
Date of birth missing (living people)
English expatriates in the United States
American male voice actors
English male stage actors
English male television actors
English people of Greek Cypriot descent
Year of birth missing (living people)